John Morrison (born 22 September 1947) is a former Australian rules footballer who played with Carlton in the Victorian Football League (VFL).

Notes

External links 

John Morrison's profile at Blueseum

1947 births
Carlton Football Club players
Australian rules footballers from Victoria (Australia)
Living people